Chetrosu is a commune in the Anenii Noi District of the Republic of Moldova. It is composed of two villages, Chetrosu and Todirești.

References

Communes of Anenii Noi District